James Llewellyn Neidlinger (born September 24, 1964) is a former Major League Baseball pitcher.

Neidlinger attended Napa High School. and signed as a free agent with the Pittsburgh Pirates in 1984. He made his major league debut on August 1, 1990, with the Los Angeles Dodgers, starting twelve games during that season.

In November 2019, Neidlinger was named head coach of the Saint Michael's College baseball team. Prior to this, he had spent a decade as an assistant coach at Middlebury College.

References

External links
, or Baseball Almanac, or Retrosheet, or The Baseball Gauge, or Venezuela Winter League

1964 births
Albuquerque Dukes players
Baseball players from California
Buffalo Bisons (minor league) players
College of Marin alumni
Harrisburg Senators players
Hawaii Islanders players
Leones del Caracas players
Living people
Los Angeles Dodgers players
Louisville Redbirds players
Macon Pirates players
Major League Baseball pitchers
Nashua Pirates players
Navegantes del Magallanes players
American expatriate baseball players in Venezuela
Portland Beavers players
Prince William Pirates players
Saint Michael's Purple Knights baseball coaches
Sportspeople from Vallejo, California